Narayan Singh Kushwah is an Indian politician and member of the Bharatiya Janata Party. Kushwah was a member of the Madhya Pradesh Legislative Assembly from the Gwalior South constituency in Gwalior district. He was the  former home minister in the Shivraj Singh Chauhan cabinet in M.P.

References 

People from Gwalior
Bharatiya Janata Party politicians from Madhya Pradesh
Living people
21st-century Indian politicians
Year of birth missing (living people)
Madhya Pradesh MLAs 2008–2013
Madhya Pradesh MLAs 2013–2018